Events from the year 1861 in Scotland.

Incumbents

Law officers 
 Lord Advocate – James Moncreiff
 Solicitor General for Scotland – Edward Maitland

Judiciary 
 Lord President of the Court of Session and Lord Justice General – Lord Colonsay
 Lord Justice Clerk – Lord Glenalmond

Events 
 27 February – ironclad warship HMS Black Prince is launched from Robert Napier's yard at Govan on the River Clyde. 
 11 March – the Portpatrick Railway opens to Stranraer Town railway station, providing a connection from Dumfries.
 June – first modern excavation of the Neolithic chambered cairn and passage grave of Maeshowe on Orkney.
 26 September – golfer Tom Morris, Sr. wins the second Open Championship.
 23 October – foundation stone of the Royal Museum laid by Prince Albert.
 25 November – a tenement collapses in the Old Town, Edinburgh killing 35 with 15 survivors.
 Edinburgh Co-operative Building Company begin construction of Stockbridge Colonies, pioneering low-cost flats for artisans.
 One O'Clock Gun first fired from Edinburgh Castle.
 Edinburgh and Glasgow Bible Societies merged to form the National Bible Society of Scotland.
 White Horse whisky first produced by James Logan Mackie of Edinburgh.

Births 
 11 April – Thomas Jaffrey, actuary (died 1953)
 17 June – Robina Nicol, New Zealand photographer and suffragist (died 1942)
 19 June – Douglas Haig, soldier and Field Marshal during World War I (died 1928)
 9 July – William Burrell, shipowner and art collector (died 1958)
 12 October – Agnes Jekyll, née Graham, artist, writer on domestic matters and philanthropist (died 1937 in England)
 24 December – John Macdonald, sportsman and physician (died 1938)

Deaths 
 8 April – John Bartholomew, Sr., cartographer (born 1805)
 4 October – Archibald Montgomerie, 13th Earl of Eglinton (born 1812 in Sicily)
 13 November – John Forbes, physician to Queen Victoria (1841–1861) (born 1787)

See also 
 Timeline of Scottish history
 1861 in the United Kingdom

References 

 
Years of the 19th century in Scotland
 Scotland
1860s in Scotland